Margan Top or Margan Pass is a mountain pass, connecting Warwan Valley in Kishtwar District  with the main Kashmir Valley. It is located south of Anantnag district in the Indian state of Jammu and Kashmir.

References

Anantnag district
Mountain passes of Jammu and Kashmir